Antilopini is a tribe of bovids often referred as true antelopes like gazelles. They live in and around the Sahara, Horn of Africa, throughout eastern and southern Africa, and Eurasia. Depending on species, the females have either very short and/or thin horns compared with the males, or no horns at all. They have smooth and glossy tan and white coats. Most species have black stripes and facial markings. They have a territorial male as a leader in herds and sometimes group with other species, such as Grant's gazelle joining with Thomson's gazelle. They have adapted well to running in open environments.

References

 
 
True antelopes
Mammal tribes